General elections were held in India in seven phases from 11 April to 19 May 2019 to elect the members of the 17th Lok Sabha. Votes were counted and the result was declared on 23 May. Around 912 million people were eligible to vote, and voter turnout was over 67 percent – the highest ever, as well as the highest ever participation by women voters.

The Bharatiya Janata Party received 37.36% of the vote, the highest vote share by a political party since the 1989 general election, and won 303 seats, further increasing its substantial majority. In addition, the BJP-led National Democratic Alliance (NDA) won 353 seats. The Indian National Congress won 52 seats, failing to get 10% of the seats needed to claim the post of Leader of the Opposition. In addition, the Congress-led United Progressive Alliance (UPA) won 91 seats, while other parties won 98 seats. 

Legislative assembly elections in the states of Andhra Pradesh, Arunachal Pradesh, Odisha and Sikkim were held simultaneously with the general election, as well as by-elections of twenty-two seats of the Tamil Nadu Legislative Assembly.

Electoral system
All 543 elected MPs are elected from single-member constituencies using first-past-the-post voting. The President of India appoints an additional two members from the Anglo-Indian community if he believes that community is under-represented.

Eligible voters must be Indian citizens, 18 or older than 18, an ordinary resident of the polling area of the constituency and registered to vote (name included in the electoral rolls), possess a valid voter identification card issued by the Election Commission of India or an equivalent. Some people convicted of electoral or other offences are barred from voting.

The elections are held on schedule and as per the Constitution of India that mandates parliamentary elections once every five years.

Election schedule

The election schedule was announced by Election Commission of India (ECI) on 10 March 2019, and with it the Model Code of Conduct came into effect.

The election was scheduled to be held in seven phases. In Bihar, Uttar Pradesh and West Bengal, the election was held in all seven phases. The polling for the Anantnag constituency in the state of Jammu and Kashmir was held in three phases, due to violence in the region.

Rescheduled voting, cancellations
Vellore, Tamil Nadu: Over  in cash was seized in Vellore from DMK leaders – a regional party in Tamil Nadu. According to The News Minute, this cash is alleged to have been for bribing the voters. Based on the evidence collected during the raids, the Election Commission of India cancelled the 18 April election date in the Vellore constituency. The DMK leaders denied wrongdoing and alleged a conspiracy.
Tripura East, Tripura: The Election Commission of India deferred polling from 18 to 23 April due to the law and order situation. The poll panel took the decision following reports from the Special Police Observers that the circumstances were not conducive for holding free and fair elections in the constituency.

Campaign

Issues

Allegations of undermining institutions
The opposition parties accused the NDA government of destroying democratic institutions and processes. Modi denied these allegations, and blamed Congress and the communists for undermining institutions including the police, the CBI, and the CAG, and cited the murder of BJP activists in Kerala and Madhya Pradesh. The Congress party, along with other opposition parties and a group of retired civil servants, accused the ECI of being compromised, and implied that they endorsed the model code of conduct violations by Narendra Modi and other BJP political leaders during their campaigns. Another group of 81 retired civil servants, judges and academics disputed these allegations, made counter-allegations, and stated that the ECI acted fairly and similarly in alleged violations by either side. The group stated that such political attacks on the ECI were a "deliberate attempt to denigrate and delegitimise the democratic institutions".

Economic performance
According to The Times of India, the major economic achievements of the incumbent NDA government included an inflation rate less than 4 per cent, the GST reform, and the Insolvency and Bankruptcy Code. Its programs, in recent years, that have positively touched many among the Indian masses, include the Jan Dhan Yojana, rural cooking gas and electricity for homes. According to the IMF, the Indian economy has been growing in recent years, its GDP growth rate is among the highest in the world for major economies, and India is expected to be the fastest growing major economy in 2019–2020 and 2020–2021, with real GDP projected to grow at 7.3 per cent. The GDP growth data has been disputed by a group of Indian social scientists, economists and the political opposition's election campaign, while a group of Indian chartered accountants has defended the data, the GDP calculation methodology, and questioned the motivations of those disputing the recent Indian GDP statistics.

The opposition's election campaign has claimed that both the demonetisation and GST law have "seriously hit small business, farmers and casual labour", states The Times of India. The incumbent has claimed that they inherited a country from the previous Congress-led government that was "a legacy of policy paralysis, corruption and economic fragility", and that the BJP-led government policies have placed India on better economic fundamentals and a fast gear. Modi claims that his government pursued demonetisation in the national interest, his government has identified and de-registered 338,000 shell companies, identified and recovered  in black money since 2014, and almost doubled India's tax base. The Congress party disputes the incumbents' claims, and has alleged that BJP offices have "become hubs of creating black money", and seeks a judicial inquiry into the Rafale deal with France and BJP's role in corruption.

National security and terrorism
In response to the 2019 Pulwama attack, the Indian Air Force conducted airstrikes inside Pakistan — for the first time since the 1971 Indo-Pakistani war. The ongoing conflict with Pakistan became a significant factor in the election. The opposition parties accused of politicising the army, whilst the BJP countered their accusations by stating that such allegations raised by them were adversely affecting the morale of armed forces.

According to the Pew Research Center, both before and after the outbreak of recent India-Pakistan tensions, their 2018 and 2019 surveys suggest that the significant majority of the voters consider Pakistan as a "very serious threat" to their country, and terrorism to be a "very big problem".

Unemployment

According to the Pew Research Center, a majority of Indian voters consider the lack of employment opportunities as a "very big problem" in their country. "About 18.6 million Indians were jobless and another 393.7 million work in poor-quality jobs vulnerable to displacement", stated the Pew report.

A report on unemployment prepared by the National Sample Survey Office's (NSSO's) periodic labour force survey, has not been officially released by the government. According to Business Today, this report is the "first comprehensive survey on employment conducted by a government agency after Prime Minister Narendra Modi announced demonetisation move in November 2016". According to this report, the 2017–2018 "usual status" unemployment rate in India is 6.1 per cent, which is a four-decade high. The government has claimed that the report was not final. According to the International Labour Organization (ILO) – a United Nations agency, unemployment is rising in India and the "unemployment rate in the country [India] will stand at 3.5 percent in 2018 and 2019 – the same level of unemployment seen in 2017 and 2016", instead of dropping to 3.4 percent as it had previously projected. According to the ILO's World Employment Social Outlook Report, the unemployment rate in India has been in the 3.4 to 3.6 percent range over the UPA-government led 2009–2014 and the NDA-government led 2014–2019 periods.

Opposition parties claimed in their election campaign that the unemployment in India had reached crisis levels. The NDA government has denied the existence of any job crisis. Prime minister Narendra Modi claimed that jobs are not lacking but the accurate data on jobs has been lacking.

The opposition has attacked the NDA government's performance with the NSSO reported 6.1 percent unemployment data. Modi and his government have questioned this job statistics report, stating that "most surveys that try to capture unemployment rate are skewed since these did not cover the unorganised sector, which accounts for 85–90 per cent of jobs [in India]".

Agrarian and rural distress
The Congress party campaign highlighted "agrarian distress" as an election issue. The BJP campaign highlighted that the Congress party had been in power for five generations of the Nehru dynasty and its past promises and campaign issues have been empty. It claimed that the recent farmer loan waivers by Congress have not reached "even 10% of the farmers" nor has it helped the financial situation of the farmers. BJP highlights that its "Kisan Samman Nidhi" helps the small farmers at the time of seed planting through a direct deposit of ₹6000 to their accounts. The opposition accused this as being an attempt to lure voters.

According to The Times of India, a group of farmer associations demanded that the 2019 election manifesto of competing political parties should promise to "keep agriculture out of the World Trade Organization (WTO)" and that the interests of Indian farmers must not be compromised in global trade treaties. They also demanded loan waivers and income support for the agriculture sector. According to the Business Standard and the United Nation's Food and Agriculture Organization, India has witnessed record crop harvests in recent years including 2017 when its farmers grew more foodgrains than ever before. However, the farmers consider the "low remunerative prices" they receive in the free market to be too low and a need for the Indian government to establish higher minimum support prices for agricultural products. These farmers consider this an issue for the 2019 general elections.

Dynasty politics
The BJP highlighted that the Congress party has relied on Rahul Gandhi for leadership since 2013, its lack of internal party institutions and claimed that whenever Congress has been in power, the freedom of press and Indian government institutions have "taken a severe beating". During the election campaign, its leaders mentioned the Emergency of 1975, the nepotism, corruption and widespread abuses of human rights under the Congress rule in the past. Congress-led alliance leader H. D. Kumaraswamy – the son of a former prime minister of India and the former chief minister of Karnataka, countered that "India developed because of dynasty politics", stating that "dynasty politics are not the main issue, rather country's problems are". The Congress alleged hypocrisy by the BJP, claiming that the BJP itself forms alliances with dynasty-based parties such as the Akali Dal in Punjab, and that family relatives of senior BJP leaders such as Rajnath Singh and Arun Jaitley have been in politics too.

According to an IndiaSpend report published by the BloombergQuint, the smaller and regional parties such as the Jammu and Kashmir National Conference, Lok Jan Sakti Party, Shiromani Akali Dal, Biju Janata Dal and Samajwadi Party have higher densities of dynasty-derived candidates and elected representatives in recent years.  While both the Congress and the BJP have also nominated candidates from political dynasties, states the report, the difference between them is that in Congress "top party leadership has been handed down from generation to generation within the same [Nehru Gandhi dynasty] family", while there has been a historic non-dynastic diversity in the top leadership within the BJP. According to the report, while BJP has also nominated candidates from political dynasties, its better public relations operation "can leap to its defence when attacked on the same grounds". In contrast to the IndiaSpend report, analysis of Kanchan Chandra, a prominent professor of Politics, of the 2004, 2009 and 2014 general elections included a finding that the Congress party has had about twice or more dynastic parliamentarians than the BJP at those elections, and higher than all major political parties in India except the Samajwadi Party. Many of these dynastic politicians in India who inherit the leadership positions have never held any jobs and lack state or local experience, states Anjali Bohlken – a professor and political science scholar, and this raises concerns of rampant nepotism and appointments of their own friends, relatives and cronies if elected. The BJP has targeted the Congress party in the 2019 elections for alleged nepotism and a family dynasty for leadership.

Campaign controversies

Income tax raids
Modi has highlighted this evidence to attack the Congress in its election campaign, alleging corruption is part of Congress party's culture.

Social media abuses and fake news
According to The New York Times and The Wall Street Journal, the election attracted a systematic attempt to spread misinformation through social media. Facebook said that over a hundred of these advocacy accounts spreading disinformation were traced to "employees of the Pakistani military public relations wing". Some others have been linked to the INC and BJP.

The BJP placed 2,500 ads on Facebook while the Congress placed 3,686 ads. According to a study by Vidya Narayanan and colleagues at the Oxford Internet Institute, social media was used by all the major parties and alliances, and all of them linked or posted divisive and conspiratorial content and images. According to Narayanan, "a third of the BJP's images, a quarter of the INC's images, and a tenth the SP-BSP's images were catalogued as divisive and conspiratorial". The Narayanan et al. study added that "we observed very limited amounts of hate speech, gore or pornography in either platform samples" by BJP, Congress or SP-BSP, but the election did include proportionally more polarising information on social media than other countries except for the US presidential election in 2016.

About 50,000 fake news stories were published during the recent Lok Sabha elections and shared 2 million times, according to a study conducted by fact-checking startup Logically.

EC actions under Article 324
Election Commission curtailed West Bengal campaigning by one day, after a bust of 19th century Bengali icon Ishwar Chandra Vidyasagar was vandalised during 7th phase poll violence.

Party campaigns

 12 January 2019 – Prime Minister Modi launched the BJP's election campaign.
 14 February 2019 – The INC president Rahul Gandhi launched his campaign from Lal Dungri village in Gujarat's Dharampur.
 24 March 2019 – The Aam Aadmi Party began its campaign in Delhi.
 2 April 2019 – The Trinamool Congress party launched its campaign from Dinhata, Coochbehar.
 7 April 2019 – Bahujan Samaj Party and Samajwadi Party began campaigning together as an alliance (Mahagathbandhan) along with regional parties such as the Rashtriya Lok Dal. Their first joint campaign started in Deoband in Saharanpur district of Uttar Pradesh.

Party manifestos

Highlights of the Congress manifesto
The Congress released its manifesto, titled Congress Will Deliver on 3 April. Some of its highlights:

 Create 1 million "Seva Mitra" jobs in rural and urban local government bodies. Fill all 400,000 central government vacancies before March 2020, and encourage state governments to fill their 2,000,000 vacancies. Enact a law that requires all non-government controlled employers with over 100 employees to implement an apprentice program.
 Enact a permanent National Commission on Agricultural Development and Planning and introduce a "Kisan Budget" (Farmer Budget) in the parliament every year. Waive all farmer loans in all states with any amounts outstanding.
 Enact a Right to Homestead Act that will provide free land to every household that does not own a home.
 Enact a Right to Healthcare Act and guarantee every citizen free diagnostics, free medicines, free hospitalisation, and free out-patient care. Double spending on healthcare to 3 percent of its GDP by 2024.
 Double spending on education to 6 percent of its GDP by 2024.
 Revise the national GST law from three tax tiers to a single moderate rate of tax. Reduce taxes on exported products to zero. Exempt from the GST essential goods and services that are currently not exempt. Enact a new Direct Taxes Code.
 Augment and rapid construction of national highways. Modernise Indian railway infrastructure. Promote green energy. Manufacturing promotion.
 Increase defence spending.
 Enact a National Election Fund, wherein public funds will be distributed to recognised political parties to run their campaign
 Preserve special status and special rights to natives of Jammu and Kashmir under Article 370 and 35A.
 Amend the Armed Forces (Special Powers) Act, 1958. End the Sedition law (Section 124A of the Indian Penal Code).

Highlights of the BJP manifesto
The BJP released its manifesto sub-titled Sankalpit Bharat, Sashakt Bharat (lit. "Resolute India, Empowered India") on 8 April. Some of its highlights:

 Implementation of a nationwide NRC exercise to identify & deport undocumented immigrants, an immigrant being defined in this context as a person who is unable to provide documentary evidence of his/her residency in India prior to 26 March 1971 or that of his/her immediate ancestors (parents & grandparents) in case of being born after the previously-mentioned date, preceded by an amendment in citizenship laws that will allow only undocumented Hindu, Sikh, Buddhist, Jain, Parsi & Christian immigrants from Pakistan, Bangladesh & Afghanistan who entered India before 31 December 2014 to automatically obtain Indian citizenship.
 End special status and special rights to natives of by abrogating Article 370 and Article 35A of the Constitution of India. 
 Double farmer incomes by 2022 by completing all major and micro-irrigation infrastructure projects, opening adequate markets and modern farm produce storage centres, implement minimum price supports for farmer produce, farmer loans and all-weather rural roads. Introduce a pension bill for small and marginal farmers to provide social security after 60 years of age.
 Bring all secondary schools under the national board quality purview. Invest  in higher education, open new and increase seats at existing engineering, management and law schools. Establish skills and innovations centre at block-level in every town. Enhance higher education opportunities for women by introducing financial support and subsidies programs. Source 10 percent of government procurement from companies with more than 50 percent female employees.
 Ensure a pucca (lit. brick-solid, modern) house, safe potable water, toilet, LPG gas cylinder, electricity, and banking account for every family. Reduce the percentage of families living under the poverty line to a single digit by 2024.
 Double the length of national highways. Improve fuel quality by mandating 10 percent ethanol in petrol. Scale renewable energy capacity to 175 GW.
 Electrify and convert to broad gauge all railway tracks.
 Establish 150,000 health and wellness centres. Start 75 new medical colleges. Raise doctor-to-population ratio to 1:1400. Triple childcare facilities. Achieve 100 percent immunisation of all babies.
 Raise India's ranking further in "ease of doing business". Double exports, introduce single-window compliance procedures for all businesses.
 Reduce air pollution by eliminating all crop residue burning.
 Digitise paperwork and proceedings, modernise the courts.
 Launch and promote a National Digital Library with e-books and leading journals to provide free knowledge accessible to all students. Launch a "Study in India" program to bring foreign students to institutes of higher education.
 Privatisation of defence, space and agriculture sector for development of India.
 Zero tolerance for terrorism, fund resources to strengthen national security, guarantee veterans, and soldier welfare, modernise police forces.

Other parties
Other national and regional parties released their manifestos too:

 The Tamil Nadu-based regional parties AIADMK and DMK released their manifesto on 18 March 2019, with each promising to release the seven Tamils jailed after being found guilty for their role in the assassination of Rajiv Gandhi, a former Congress party leader and prime minister of India. The AIADMK promised to press for the political rights of the Tamil people in the Eelam region of Sri Lanka, while the DMK has promised Indian citizenship to all Sri Lankan expats. The AIADMK also promised to raise the tax exemption limit and revisions to the GST law. The DMK promised a probe into Rafale fighter jet deal, and a plan to distribute free sanitary napkins to working women along with starting martial arts schools for girls.
 Biju Janata Dal (BJD) released its manifesto on 9 April 2019. It also promised to complete two expressways.
It also stated the restoration of inheritance tax and an increase in the taxes on individuals and corporations. It also promised spending 6 per cent of GDP on education, enacting a Right to Free Health Care with 3.5 per cent of GDP on health in the short term and 5 per cent in the long term, introduction of price controls on essential drugs, breaking monopoly of drug multinationals, as well as enact a Right to Guaranteed Employment in urban areas.
 Nationalist Congress Party (NCP) promised to open talks with Pakistan on terrorism. It also promised to expand trade and political relationship with Russia, and seek to weaken Russia's ties with China and Pakistan.
It has also proposed a new property tax of 2 percent on homes valued above  as well as raising income taxes on the affluent. It also promised to create 100,000 new jobs every year.
 Telugu Desam Party released its manifesto on 5 April 2019.
 AITMC's manifesto was released on 27 March 2019. It promised a judicial probe into demonetisation, a review of GST law, and sought to bring back the Planning Commission. It also promised free medical care, expanding the "100-day work scheme" currently operating in India to "200-day work scheme" along with a pay increase.
 Aam Aadmi Party released its manifesto on 25 April 2019 promising full statehood for Delhi to give the Delhi government control over police and other institutions. The manifesto promised 85 per cent reservations in the Delhi-based colleges and jobs for the voters of Delhi and their families.

Campaign finance
Several organisations offered varying estimates for the cost of the election campaign. The Centre for Media Studies in New Delhi estimated that the election campaign could exceed $7 billion. According to the Association for Democratic Reforms (ADR), an election watchdog, in the financial year 2017–18 BJP received , about 12 times more donations than Congress and five other national parties combined.

The electoral bonds in denominations ranging from 1,000 rupees to 10 million rupees ($14 to $140,000) can be purchased and donated to a political party. The bonds don't carry the name of the donor and are exempt from tax. Factly – an India data journalism portal, traced the electoral bond donations for 2018 under India's Right to Information Act. According to Bloomberg, this accounted for 31.2 percent of political donations in 2018, while 51.4 percent of the total donated amount were each below  and these too were from unknown donors. About 47 percent of the donations to political parties were from known sources. Between 1 January and 31 March 2019, donors bought  worth of electoral bonds and donated. The spending in elections boosts national GDP, and the 2009 election spending contributed about 0.5 percent to GDP.

According to Centre for Media Studies, the BJP spent over Rs 280 billion (or 45%) of the Rs 600 billion spent by all political parties during the polls. Congress questions BJP over its poll expenditure

Parties and alliances

Political alliances 

With the exception of 2014, no single party has won the majority of seats in the Lok Sabha since 1984, and therefore, forming alliances is the norm in Indian elections.

There were three main national pre-poll alliances. They are the National Democratic Alliance (NDA) headed by the BJP, the United Progressive Alliance (UPA) headed by the INC and the Left Front of the communist leaning parties. Given the volatile nature of coalition politics in India, alliances may change during and after the election.

The INC did not form alliances in states where it is in direct contest with the BJP. These states include Himachal Pradesh, Uttarakhand, Rajasthan, Gujarat, Madhya Pradesh, and Chhattisgarh. It formed alliances with regional parties in Jammu and Kashmir, Bihar, Tamil Nadu, Maharashtra, Karnataka, Jharkhand, and Kerala.

The left parties, most notably the Communist Party of India (Marxist) contested mostly on its own in its strongholds West Bengal, Tripura and Kerala, confronting both NDA and UPA. In Tamil Nadu, it was part of Secular Progressive Alliance led by DMK and allied with Jana Sena Party in Andhra Pradesh.

In January 2019, Bahujan Samaj Party and Samajwadi Party announced a grand alliance (Mahagathbandhan) to contest 76 out of the 80 seats in Uttar Pradesh leaving two seats, namely Amethi and Rae Bareli, for INC and another two for other political parties.

Political parties 
More than 650 parties contested in these elections. Most of them were small with regional appeal. The main parties are the Bharatiya Janata Party (BJP) and the Indian National Congress (INC). This was the first time that BJP (437) contested more seats than Congress (421) in the Lok Sabha elections.

Candidates 

Altogether 8,039 candidates were in the fray for 542 parliamentary constituencies, i.e., 14.8 candidates per constituency on an average, according to PRS India, an NGO.

About 40% of the candidates fielded by Prime Minister Narendra Modi's Bharatiya Janata Party had a criminal case against them. Key opposition party Congress was not far behind with 39% of the candidates with criminal charges, according to Association of Democratic Reforms analysis.

Voter statistics
According to the ECI, 900 million people were eligible to vote, with an increase of 84.3 million voters since the last election in 2014, making it the largest-ever election in the world. 15 million voters aged 18–19 years became eligible to vote for the first time. 468 million eligible voters were males, 432 million were females and 38,325 identified themselves belonging to third gender. Total 71,735 overseas voters also enrolled.

The residents of the former enclaves exchanged under the 2015 India-Bangladesh boundary agreement voted for the first time.

Electronic voting machines and security
The ECI deployed a total of 1.74 million voter-verified paper audit trail (VVPAT) units and 3.96 million electronic voting machines (EVM) in 1,035,918 polling stations. Approximately 270,000 paramilitary and 2 million state police personnel provided organisational support and security at various polling booths. On 9 April 2019, the Supreme Court ordered the ECI to increase VVPAT slips vote count to five randomly selected EVMs per assembly constituency, which meant that the ECI had to count VVPAT slips of 20,625 EVMs before it could certify the final election results.

Voting
In the first phase, 69.58 per cent of the 142 million eligible voters cast their vote to elect their representatives for 91 Lok Sabha seats. The voter turnout was 68.77 per cent in the same constituencies in the 2014 general elections. In the second phase, 156 million voters were eligible to vote for 95 Lok Sabha seats and the turnout was 69.45 per cent, compared to 69.62 per cent in 2014. For the third phase, 189 million voters were eligible to elect 116 Lok Sabha representatives. According to ECI, the turnout for this phase was 68.40 per cent, compared to 67.15 per cent in 2014. In the fourth of seven phases, 65.50 per cent of the 128 million eligible voters cast their vote to elect 72 representatives to the Indian parliament while the turnout for the same seats in the 2014 election was 63.05 per cent. The fifth phase was open to 87.5 million eligible voters, who could cast their vote in over 96,000 polling booths. In the sixth phase, 64.40 per cent of the 101 million eligible voters cast their vote in about 113,000 polling stations.

The final turnout stood at 67.11 per cent, the highest ever turnout recorded in any of the general elections till date. The percentage is 1.16 per cent higher than the 2014 elections whose turnout stood at 65.95 per cent. Over 600 million voters polled their votes in 2019 Indian General elections.

Turnout

State/UT-wise voter turnout details

Opinion polls

Results

Outgoing Cabinet Minister to lose in the election
 Anant Geete – Minister of Heavy Industries and Public Enterprises (Raigad) Shiv Sena

Outgoing Ministers of State to lose in the election
 Manoj Sinha - Minister of State for Communications (Independent charge) (Ghazipur) BJP

 Alphons Kannanthanam - Minister of State for Electronics and IT and Minister of State for Tourism (Independent charge) (Ernakulam) BJP
 Hardeep Singh Puri - Minister of State for Housing and Urban Poverty Alleviation (Amritsar) BJP
 Hansraj Gangaram Ahir - Minister of State for Home Affairs (Chandrapur)
 Pon Radhakrishnan - Minister of State for Finance (Kanyakumari) BJP

Former Prime Minister to lose in the election
 H. D. Deve Gowda (JD-S)- Prime Minister of India from 1996–1997 lost from Tumkur of Karnataka

Former Chief Ministers to lose in the election
 H. D. Deve Gowda - Karnataka (Tumkur) JD(S)
 Sheila Dikshit - Delhi (North East Delhi) INC
 Digvijaya Singh - Madhya Pradesh (Bhopal) INC
 Sushil Kumar Shinde - Maharashtra (Solapur) INC
 Ashok Chavan - Maharashtra (Nanded) INC
 Harish Rawat - Uttarakhand (Nainital–Udhamsingh Nagar) INC
 Bhupinder Singh Hooda - Haryana (Sonipat) INC
 Veerappa Moily - Karnataka (Chikkballapur) INC
 Mukul Sangma - Meghalaya (Tura) INC
 Nabam Tuki - Arunachal Pradesh (Arunachal West) INC
 Shibu Soren - Jharkhand (Dumka) JMM
 Jitan Ram Manjhi - Bihar (Gaya) HAM
 Babu Lal Marandi - Jharkhand (Kodarma) JVM(P)
 Mehbooba Mufti - Jammu and Kashmir (Anantnag) PDP

Aftermath

Reactions

National 

Indian National Congress party leaders such as Rahul Gandhi and others conceded defeat and congratulated Modi and his party. Other opposition parties and political leaders such as Sharad Pawar, Mamata Banerjee and Omar Abdullah, congratulated PM Modi and BJP for their victory.

On 20 November 2019 the Association for Democratic Reforms filed a petition with the Supreme Court of India over alleged ballot-counting discrepancies in the Lok Sabha voting and seeking a probe by the ECI.

International 
The leaders of Afghanistan, Argentina, Australia, Austria, Bahrain, Bangladesh, Bhutan, Botswana, Brazil, Bulgaria, Burundi, Canada, China, Comoros, Cyprus, Czech Republic, Estonia, France, Georgia, Germany, Ghana, Iceland, Indonesia, Iran, Israel, Italy, Jamaica, Japan, Kazakhstan, Kenya, Kuwait, Kyrgyzstan, Latvia, Lesotho, Lichtenstein, Luxembourg, Madagascar, Malaysia, Maldives, Malta, Mexico, Mongolia, Myanmar, Namibia, Nepal, Netherlands, Nicaragua, North Korea, Nigeria, New Zealand, Oman, Pakistan, Palestine, Portugal, Qatar, Russia, Rwanda, Saudi Arabia, Senegal, Seychelles, Singapore, South Africa, South Korea, Sri Lanka, St. Vincent and the Grenadines, Switzerland, Tajikistan, Thailand, Turkmenistan, Uganda, Ukraine, United Arab Emirates, United Kingdom, United States, Uzbekistan, Venezuela, Vietnam, Zambia, and Zimbabwe congratulated Narendra Modi and the BJP on their victory.

Government formation

Swearing-in ceremony

Impact
The benchmark BSE Sensex and Nifty50 indices hit intraday record highs and the Indian rupee strengthened after the exit polls and on the day the election results were announced.

Timeline

See also
2019 Indian Rajya Sabha elections
2019 elections in India
Politics of India

Notes

References

Further reading
Surjit S. Bhalla. Citizen Raj: Indian Elections 1952-2019 (2019 Buy Citizen Raj: Indian Elections 1952-2019 Book Online at Low Prices in India | Citizen Raj: Indian Elections 1952-2019 Reviews & Ratings - Amazon.in 
Prannoy Roy, Dorab R. Sopariwala. The Verdict: Decoding India's Elections (2019) The Verdict

External links

 
2019 elections in India
April 2019 events in India
General elections in India
May 2019 events in India